Psimolofou or  Psimolophou is a village located about 16 km from Nicosia District Capital of Cyprus, en route to the historic Machairas Monastery.

Psimolofou rests at a height of 340 meters above sea level and it is surrounded by a number of perfectly flat hills and it is only 500 meters away from Padiaos river.

Psimolofou was established as a small village since the 12th century AD. The Old village in the center has narrow streets and very old houses made of soil and hay blocks called plynths

Psimolofou derived its name from a small hill nearby which resembles a bread. However, most probably the name has been derived from the nearby hill - tall hill.

According to Jean Richard in a paper written in Melanges d'Archeologie et d'Histoire, Psimolophou was one of Cyprus's main centres for tanning, the craft practiced by Jewish tanners from the 14th century until the second half of the 20th century.

Psimolofou has approximately 2000 residents and it has been growing steadily since the 19th century where records were kept. Up until the 1970s, most of the inhabitants were involved with agriculture - growing fruits and vegetables. Today, very few inhabitants are still farmers. Most of the residents now hold jobs or have businesses in Nicosia.

Psimolofou is a fast expanding residential area very near to the city but with cooler climate especially in the summer with only detached and some semi detached houses. Psimolofou has public elementary and primary schools.

The church of Psimolofou is dedicated to Panayia Katholoki which was built in the 19th century over the ruins of an older church that was destroyed by fire. It is beautifully decorated with wall paintings. Two of them from the earlier building and the rest in the very recent years. There are two other churches, a ruined one from the medieval ages and modern one built in the late 20th century.

There bank with ATM, a well sized supermarket, a hardware store, a car tyres shop, 3 traditional Cyprus coffee shops and a 24-hour 365 days convenience store. 

It uses a 193 metres tall guyed mast radiator - the tallest structure in Cyprus.

References

Communities in Nicosia District